Jonathan Richard Hunt (born 2 November 1971) is an English footballer who plays for Enfield Town. He made more than 200 appearances in the Football League for a variety of clubs and played in the Premier League for Derby County.

Football career
Born in Camden, London, Hunt was a striker in youth football before converting to midfield, and developed into a skilful right-sided midfielder. He played under manager Barry Fry at Barnet, winning promotion to Division Two in his first full season, and Southend United before following Fry to Birmingham City in September 1994 for a fee of £500,000.

The most successful time of Hunt's career was spent at Birmingham where he played over a hundred games. His first season was disrupted by injury, but he was still able to contribute to Birmingham becoming Division Two champions, and he played in the final of the Football League Trophy at Wembley, the game won by Paul Tait's golden goal. While at the club he scored 18 league goals, and was leading scorer in the 1995–96 season with 15 goals in all competitions, a performance that earned him the club's Player of the Year award.

Hunt then moved on to Premier League Derby County, again for £500,000. Although he did play (and score) in the top flight he only made seven first team starts, and his career started to go downhill from there. He made loan moves to Sheffield United and Ipswich Town, both of the Championship, before joining Sheffield United on a permanent basis in a swap deal for Vassilis Borbokis. He played regularly until Neil Warnock took over as manager, and was then made available for transfer. A trial at Norwich City proving unsuccessful, Hunt made yet another loan move, this time to Cambridge United of Division Two. At the end of the 1999–2000 season Sheffield United cut their losses, paid up the remaining two years of his contract and released him.

He joined Wimbledon of the Championship in September 2000 but appeared only intermittently. The highlight of his Wimbledon career came when he scored the extra-time goal to seal a 3–1 victory over Premier League Middlesbrough in the FA Cup fifth round. With the transfer window about to close, he agreed to link up yet again with former manager Barry Fry, now at Peterborough United, but changed his mind at the last minute. He played no more first team games for Wimbledon and was released at the end of the season.

He eventually joined Fry at Second Division Peterborough in September 2002 on non-contract terms. Although Fry reportedly said he would have "no hesitation" about giving him his debut in the weekend's game, Hunt made no first team appearances for Peterborough and was released at the end of the season.

Having been out of the game for five years, in February 2008 Hunt signed a short-term contract until the end of the season for St Albans City of the Conference South, managed by former Birmingham and Peterborough colleague Steve Castle. In August 1990, as an 18-year-old, he had made one previous appearance for the club. He remained with the club until the end of the 2008–09 season, scoring 9 goals from 57 appearances in all competitions. After four matches for Harrow Borough without scoring, Hunt joined Isthmian League Premier Division club A.F.C. Hornchurch in September 2009. In September 2012 he joined Enfield Town.

Honours
Barnet
 Third Division promotion: 1992–93
Birmingham City
 Second Division champions: 1994–95
 Football League Trophy winners: 1994–95

References

External links

1971 births
Living people
Footballers from Camden Town
English footballers
Association football midfielders
Barnet F.C. players
Southend United F.C. players
Birmingham City F.C. players
Derby County F.C. players
Sheffield United F.C. players
Ipswich Town F.C. players
Cambridge United F.C. players
Wimbledon F.C. players
Peterborough United F.C. players
English Football League players
Premier League players
Hornchurch F.C. players
Harrow Borough F.C. players
St Albans City F.C. players
Enfield Town F.C. players
Woking F.C. players